"L-O-V-E (Love)" is a 1975 Soul single by Al Green.  The single was produced by Willie Mitchell, who also co-wrote the song along with Al Green and Mabon Hodges.
The single was from the LP Al Green Is Love and continued a string of number one R&B hits throughout the 1970s.

Chart History
"L-O-V-E (Love) was at the top spot on the R&B charts for two weeks and made it to thirteen on the pop singles chart.

References

1975 songs
1975 singles
Al Green songs
Hi Records singles
Songs written by Al Green
Songs written by Willie Mitchell (musician)
Song recordings produced by Willie Mitchell (musician)
Songs written by Teenie Hodges